Malta competed at the 2022 Winter Olympics in Beijing, China, from 4 to 20 February 2022.

Malta's athlete consisted of snowboarder Jenise Spiteri, who also carried the Maltese flag during the opening ceremony. Meanwhile a volunteer was the flagbearer during the closing ceremony.

Competitors
The following is the list of number of competitors participating at the Games per sport/discipline.

Snowboarding

Malta qualified one female snowboarder in the halfpipe event. This will mark Malta's Winter Olympics debut in the sport.

Freestyle
Women

Non-competing sports

Alpine skiing

By meeting the basic qualification standards, Malta qualified one female alpine skier. That skier, Élise Pellegrin, Malta's only Winter Olympian before this edition, however, was not selected for the team due to lack of recent competition.

References

Nations at the 2022 Winter Olympics
2022
Winter Olympics